Drahos is a surname. Notable people with the surname include:

Béla Drahos (born 1955), Hungarian conductor and flautist
Lajos Drahos (1895–1983), Hungarian communist politician
Nick Drahos (1918–2018), American football player
Peter Drahos, Australian academic
Jiří Drahoš, Czech politician

See also
Jonathan Wade-Drahos, American actor